The King Fahd Stadium, also nicknamed "Tent Stadium" or "Pearl of Stadiums", is a multi-purpose stadium in Riyadh, Saudi Arabia. It is currently used mostly for football matches as the home of Saudi Arabia, and it also has athletics facilities.

Overview
The stadium was built in 1987 with capacity over 67,000 seats. It measures 116 yards by 74 yards. It also has one of the largest stadium roofs in the world. It was a venue for matches of the FIFA World Youth Championship in 1989, including the final match.

In September 2017, as part of Saudi Vision 2030, there was a celebration of the 87th anniversary of the Saudi founding with concerts and performances, with women for the first time being allowed into the stadium.

The stadium has been included in the FIFA video games since FIFA 13, when the Saudi Professional League began being featured in the game. A modified version of the stadium with two tiers all around was featured in the Pro Evolution Soccer series during the PlayStation 2 era under the name ‘Nakhon Ratchasima’.

The cost of construction was about 1.912 billion Saudi riyals or $510 million. The stadium's roof shades over 67,000 seats and covers an area of 47,000 square feet. The 24 columns are arranged in a circle with a 247-metre diameter. The huge umbrella keeps the sun off the seats and concourse slabs, providing shade and comfort in the hot desert climate. The first goal in an official game was scored by Majed Abdullah.

As a personal touch to the stadium, a royal balcony was constructed. The architect was Michael KC Cheah.

Events 
The stadium's first major musical event was holding a concert by BTS, which was their first concert in the Middle East, as part of their Love Yourself: Speak Yourself World Tour on 11 October 2019. This made the band the first international act to perform in the stadium. They played to an audience of 31,899 people.

The stadium hosted WWE's event Crown Jewel on 31 October 2019.

The stadium also hosted all the three matches of 2021–22 Supercopa de España which was won by Real Madrid. The semi-final between Barcelona and Real Madrid was the first official  to be held in a stadium outside of Spain.

On 28 October 2022, David Guetta performed during the opening ceremony of Saudi Games 2022.

On 15 January 2023, the 2023 Supercopa de España Final was hosted in the stadium with Barcelona winning the cup. Three days later, the stadium hosted the 2022 Supercoppa Italiana between A.C. Milan and Inter Milan.

See also
 List of things named after Saudi kings

References

External links
World Stadium Article
World Football Profile
Soccerway Profile

1987 establishments in Saudi Arabia
Football venues in Saudi Arabia
Buildings and structures in Riyadh
Sports venues in Saudi Arabia
Athletics (track and field) venues in Saudi Arabia
Saudi Arabia
Multi-purpose stadiums in Saudi Arabia
1997 FIFA Confederations Cup stadiums
Venues of the 2034 Asian Games
Asian Games football venues
1992 King Fahd Cup
1995 King Fahd Cup
Sport in Riyadh
Sports venues completed in 1987